Mariana Duque was the defending champion, having won the previous event in 2011, but lost in the semifinals to Johanna Larsson.

Lara Arruabarrena won the tournament, defeating Larsson in the final, 6–1, 6–3.

Seeds

Main draw

Finals

Top half

Bottom half

References 
 Main draw

Seguros Bolivar Open Bogota - Singles
Seguros Bolívar Open Bogotá